13 Minutes is a 2021 disaster film written, directed and produced by Lindsay Gossling, in her feature debut film, and starring Trace Adkins, Thora Birch, Peter Facinelli, Anne Heche, Amy Smart and Paz Vega.

Premise
Four families in the fictional Oklahoma town of Minninnewah, wrestle with undocumented immigration, closeted homosexuality, abortion, and other issues before a massive tornado wipes out the town, leaving death and destruction in its path. Following the devastation, a regional emergency manager must respond to the disaster while trying to locate her Deaf daughter.

Cast

Production and themes
The title references "the short time frame residents have to seek shelter" when a tornado is detected. The film "follows four different families who are all dealing with their own issues" before the disaster strikes, and through them weaves in social issues such as undocumented immigrants, abortion, and religious intolerance. The film was filmed in Oklahoma.

Release
The film had a first limited theatrical release on October 29, 2021 by Quiver, then in the United Arab Emirates on November 11, 2021 and in Portugal on January 13, 2022. It was released on VOD by Quiver on December 7, 2021, and by Signature Entertainment on January 17, 2022.

Reception

Box office
13 Minutes grossed $45,653 in the United Arab Emirates and $21,760 in Portugal, for a worldwide total of $67,413.

Critical response
On review aggregator Rotten Tomatoes, the film holds an approval rating of 27% based on 22 reviews, with an average rating of 4.3/10. On Metacritic, the film holds a score of 40 out of 100, based on 5 critics, indicating "mixed or average reviews".
The Guardian gave the film a middling review, as it found the plot weakened by convenient turns of fate against negatively portrayed characters. Rex Reed for The New York Observer gave an overall positive review, that "the film is sometimes contrived in its efforts to keep the various plot lines connected," but "benefits substantially from the compelling contributions of a likable cast."

References

External links
 
 
 

2021 films
2021 directorial debut films
2020s American films
2021 action films
2020s English-language films
2020s Spanish-language films
American disaster films
American action films
Films shot in Oklahoma
Films set in Oklahoma